Her Secret Weapon (also called The Secret Weapon and The Secret Weapon, Her) is a 2015 South Korean reality show that focuses on members of lesser-known K-pop girl groups. The show explores what it is that turns people into fans of a certain girl group or individual idol by exposing the charms or "secret weapons" of each contestant. As ten contestants show off their hidden talents and charms through competition, their rankings in various missions are decided by a panel of ten judges who were reporters, industry experts, and passionate girl group fans. The show premiered on June 19, 2015, on MBC Every 1.

History 
Beginning June 5, 2015, MBC Plus Media began teasing members of the show's cast, releasing a new member's identity every few days and eventually releasing a video trailer for the show as a whole. On June 17, 2015, a poster of all ten contestants was released on social media.

The show is hosted by Defconn, Jang Su-won, and Boom and features Yerin (GFriend), Dahye (BESTie), Alice (Hello Venus), Solbin (LABOUM), Sihyun (SPICA), Daye (Berry Good), Jisoo (TAHITI), Minhee (STELLAR), Jei (Fiestar), and Daeun (2EYES).

In the fifth episode, Yerin, Minhee, Jei, and Daye were eliminated. They were then given the choice to stay or leave the show. Yerin and Minhee chose to stay, while Jei and Daye chose to be replaced by a group mate. In the sixth episode, Taeha became the Berry Good representative and Cao Lu became the Fiestar representative.

Episodes

Episode 1Aired: June 19, 2015Role Model: Suzy (of miss A)

Episode 2Aired: June 26, 2015Role Model: Hyuna (of 4Minute)

Episode 3Aired: July 3, 2015Role Model: IU

Episode 4Aired: July 10, 2015Role Model: CL (of 2NE1)

Episode 5Aired: July 17, 2015Role Model: CL (of 2NE1) (Cont.)

Episode 6Aired: July 24, 2015Role Model: Soyou (of Sistar)

Episode 7Aired: July 31, 2015Role Model: Soyou of Sistar (cont.)

Episode 8Aired: August 7, 2015Role Model: Hyeri (of Girl's Day)

Episode 9Aired: August 14, 2015Role Model: Hyeri (of Girl's Day) (cont.)

Episode 10Aired: August 21, 2015Role Model: Hyeri (of Girl's Day) (cont.)

Episode 11Aired: August 28, 2015Role Model: Goo Hara (of KARA)

Episode 12Aired: September 4, 2015Role Model: Goo Hara (of KARA) (cont.)

Contestant rankings

 These contestants tied for second place.
 These contestants tied for third place.
 These contestants tied for fifth place. 
 These contestants tied for sixth place.
 These contestants tied for seventh place. 
 These contestants tied for eighth place. 
 These contestants were eliminated, but chose to continue with the show.
 These contestants were eliminated from competition and replaced with their group mates.
 This contestant replaced their group mate after they were eliminated.
 This contestant was absentee for ranking.

References

Korean-language television shows
2015 South Korean television series debuts
South Korean variety television shows
South Korean reality television series
MBC TV original programming